Peter Verhelst (born 28 January 1962) is a Belgian Flemish novelist, poet and dramatist. He won the  Ferdinand Bordewijk Prijs for Tongkat.

Life 
Peter Verhelst was born in Bruges, Belgium. In his youth, he was extremely interested in books, reading atlases and encyclopaediae, as well as novels, and writing poetry from the age of 16.

While a teacher in Dutch, English and History, he debuted in 1987 with the poem "Obsidiaan", with his first novel - "Vloeibaar harnas" - following in 1993. Thereafter, he worked as a teacher at the Institute for Food in Bruges, quitting in 1999 to begin writing full-time. In 2000, he won the prestigious Gouden Uil (Golden Owl) and Young Gold Owl (Jonge Gouden Uil), a literary prize for Belgian literature in the Dutch language. He also started working as a playwright, with his first play completed in 1997.

In 2016 he won the Ida Gerhardt Poëzieprijs for his poetry book Wij totale vlam (2014). In 2019 he has got the Confituur Boekhandelsprijs, granted by the association of independent Flemish book dealers, for his essay book Voor het vergeten. For his lifetime achievements he won 2021 the Constantijn Huygens Prize.

Verhelst currently lives and works in Bruges, Belgium.

Important works

Poetry 
Obsidiaan (1987)
OTTO (1998)
Angel (1990)
Witte Bloemen (1991)
Master (1992)
De Boom N (1994)
Verhemelte (1996)
Verrukkingen (1997)
Alaska (2003)
Nieuwe sterrenbeelden (2008)
Zoo van het denken (2011)
Wij totale vlam (2014)
Zing Zing (2016)Koor (2017)Wat ons had kunnen zijn (2018)Zon (2019)2050 (2021)

 Prose Vloeibaar harnas (1993)Het spieren alfabet (1995)De kleurenvanger (1996)Tongkat (1999)Zwellend fruit (2000)Memoires van een Luipaard (2001)Mondschilderingen (2002)Zwerm (2005)Huis van de Aanrakingen (2010)De allerlaatste caracara ter wereld (2012)Geschiedenis van een berg (2013)De kunst van het crashen (2015)De zeer vermoeide man en de vrouw die hartstochtelijk van bonsai hield (2016)Voor het vergeten (2018)

 Theater Maria Salomé (1997)Romeo en Julia (studie van een verdrinkend lichaam) (1998)Red Rubber Balls (1999)S*ckmyp (2000)AARS! (2000)Scratching the inner fields (2001)Philocrates (2002)Het sprookjesbordeel (2002)Blush' (2002)
Sonic Boom (2002)
Icarus/Man-o-War (2002) CREW Eric Joris
Philoctetes Fortify My Arms (2003) CREW Eric Joris
Crash (2004) CREW Eric Joris
Terra Nova (2011) CREW Eric Joris
Absence (October 2015) CREW Eric Joris and NTGent

See also

 Flemish literature
 CREW Eric Joris

Sources
Over Verhelsts poëzie (Dutch)
Over Verhelsts Tongkat (Dutch)

1962 births
Living people
Writers from Bruges
Flemish poets
20th-century Belgian dramatists and playwrights
21st-century Belgian dramatists and playwrights
Belgian male dramatists and playwrights
Belgian male novelists
Ferdinand Bordewijk Prize winners
Belgian male poets
20th-century Belgian novelists
21st-century Belgian novelists
20th-century Belgian poets
21st-century Belgian poets
Belgian speculative fiction writers
20th-century Belgian male writers
21st-century Belgian male writers
Woutertje Pieterse Prize winners
Gouden Griffel winners